Suresh Kumar Srivastava was an Indian politician and member of Uttar Pradesh Legislative Assembly. He won Lucknow Central assembly seat three times as a BJP candidate and represented Lucknow West constituency. He was also a professional lawyer. Srivastava died on 23 April 2021, from COVID-19.

Political career
Srivastava was a member of 17th Legislative Assembly, Uttar Pradesh of India. He represented the ‘Lucknow west’ constituency in Lucknow district of Uttar Pradesh.

Posts held

References

Uttar Pradesh MLAs 2007–2012
Uttar Pradesh MLAs 2017–2022
Politicians from Lucknow
2021 deaths
1944 births
Deaths from the COVID-19 pandemic in India
People from Balrampur
Bharatiya Janata Party politicians from Uttar Pradesh